FK Vršac is a defunct football club based in Vršac, Vojvodina, Serbia.

History
The club competed in the Vojvodina League, the third tier of Yugoslav football, between 1981 and 1988, when the competition was demoted to become the fourth tier.

At the beginning of the new millennium, the club was known as FK Jedinstvo. They won the Vojvodina League East in 2005–06 and took promotion to the Serbian League Vojvodina. During the next season, the club reverted its name back to FK Vršac.

After spending six consecutive seasons in the Serbian League Vojvodina, the club suffered relegation to the fourth tier in 2012. They would win the Vojvodina League East in the 2013–14 campaign to earn promotion back to the Serbian League Vojvodina. The club spent the next three years in the third tier, before stopping to compete.

Honours
Vojvodina League East (Tier 4)
 2005–06, 2013–14

Seasons

Notable players
For a list of all FK Vršac players with a Wikipedia article, see :Category:FK Vršac players.

Managerial history

References

External links
 Club page at Srbijasport

1913 establishments in Serbia
2017 disestablishments in Serbia
Association football clubs disestablished in 2017
Association football clubs established in 1913
Defunct football clubs in Serbia
Football clubs in Vojvodina
Sport in Vršac